Georgi Penkov Bozhilov (born 12 February 1987) is a Bulgarian professional footballer who plays for Marek Dupnitsa. He has played much of his career as a second striker but he has also been used as a striker and as an attacking midfielder.

Career

Early career
Born in Sofia, Bozhilov joined CSKA Sofia's Academy at the age of 15 having previously been at Septemvri Sofia. In 2004, he left CSKA's Academy and signed first professional contract with Naftex Burgas, together with his teammates Vladislav Stoyanov and Orlin Starokin.

Chernomorets Burgas
In June 2006, Bozhilov joined Chernomorets Burgas, but suffered a severe knee injury and missed all matches of the 2006–07 season. He made his league debut in a 6–1 away win at Belasitsa Petrich on 12 August 2007, coming on in the 81st minute as a substitute. Bozhilov then netted his first ever professional goal of his career in the league match against Lokomotiv Plovdiv on 6 October 2007, scoring the only goal in a 1–0 home win. He scored a total of 5 goals in 25 A Group games in the 2007–08 season.

Lokomotiv Plovdiv (loan)
On 31 August 2009, Bozhilov was loaned out to fellow A Group club Lokomotiv Plovdiv for four months. On 26 November, Bozhilov returned to Chernomorets after a hamstring injury.

Cherno More
On 24 January 2010, Bozhilov completed a move from Chernomorets to Cherno More, signing a long-term contract for an undisclosed fee. He made his competitive debut for Cherno More in a league game against Sliven 2000 on 8 March 2010, wearing the number 14. Bozhilov scored his first goal a week later, in a 3–2 home win over Lokomotiv Plovdiv.

On 7 January 2012, it was announced that Ukrainian Premier League side Zorya Luhansk had agreed a deal to sign Bozhilov. Five days later, Zorya however pulled out of the transfer after it was reported that he failed his medical with the club.

On 31 August 2013, Bozhilov hit his first goals of the 2013–14 season, scoring twice in the 3–1 home win against Ludogorets Razgrad. He made his 100th league appearance for Cherno More in a 1–0 away win at Neftochimic Burgas on 14 September.

Beroe
In June 2015, Bozhilov signed a contract with Beroe Stara Zagora as a free agent, after his contract had expired with Cherno More at the end of the 2014–15 season. He scored on his competitive debut for Beroe on 2 July, scoring the second in a 2–0 away victory over Atlantas in the first qualifying round of the 2015–16 Europa League.

Return to Cherno More
On 14 June 2017, Bozhilov re-joined Cherno More Varna. On 15 July, he scored the winner in his second debut for the team in a 1–0 home win over Vitosha Bistritsa.

International career
On 2 September 2011, Bozhilov made his debut for the Bulgarian national team, when he came on as a substitute in a Euro 2012 qualifying match against England for the final 28 minutes.

Career statistics

Honours

Club
Cherno More
 Bulgarian Cup: 2014–15

References

External links
 Player profile at extrafootie.co.uk
 
 

1987 births
Living people
Footballers from Sofia
Bulgarian footballers
Bulgaria international footballers
First Professional Football League (Bulgaria) players
PFC Chernomorets Burgas players
PFC Lokomotiv Plovdiv players
PFC Cherno More Varna players
PFC Beroe Stara Zagora players
Association football forwards